The Mayor of Hastings is the head of the municipal government of Hastings, New Zealand, and presides over the Hastings District Council.  The first mayor was Robert Wellwood (1886–1887), and the current mayor is Sandra Hazlehurst, who is the first female to be elected to the office.

The mayor is directly elected using a first-past-the-post electoral system.

List of mayors of Hastings
There have been 22 mayors of Hastings.

References

 
Hastings